Álvaro Delgado may refer to:

 Álvaro Delgado (journalist) (born 1966), Mexican investigative journalist and author
 Álvaro Delgado (politician) (born 1969), Uruguayan politician and veterinarian
 Álvaro Delgado (footballer) (born 1995), Chilean footballer